Paul Kent is an Australian journalist and former rugby league footballer.

In 1989, he played in one first grade match for Parramatta at halfback, becoming the 481st player for the club.

Since retiring, he has become a journalist and now works for The Daily Telegraph and is currently co-host of NRL 360 on Fox Sports alongside former player Braith Anasta.

He has written two books; Sonny Ball and Johnny Lewis: The Biography — about Sonny Bill Williams and Johnny Lewis, respectively. Sonny Ball was chosen as one of the best sports books of 2015 by Australian newspaper The New Daily. Kent is a weekly panel member for Triple M's Sunday NRL Show.

Kent's opinions of Melbourne coach, Craig Bellamy, brought forth a response from the coach who claimed the accusations were disrespectful and out of line.

In May 2022, Kent left his position from radio station Triple M after he claimed to have a differing view to an on air incident with fellow presenter Anthony Maroon. Kent was asked to apologise over the incident in which Kent along with James Hooper bullied Maroon live on air. Kent refused to apologise to the station which resulted in him handing in his resignation.

References

External links

Australian rugby league players
Australian sports journalists
Fox Sports (Australian TV network) people
Parramatta Eels players
Rugby league halfbacks
Year of birth missing (living people)
Place of birth missing (living people)